Moeness G. Amin (Ahmed Moeness Amin) (Arabic: أحمد مؤنس أمين) (born 1955) is an Egyptian-American professor and engineer. Amin is the director of the Center for Advanced Communications and a professor in the Department of Electrical and Computer Engineering at Villanova University.

Early life and education
Moeness Amin was born and raised in Cairo, Egypt. He graduated with a BSc degree in electrical engineering from Cairo University in 1976, and after teaching there for a year, he left to receive his MSc degree in electrical engineering from King Fahd University of Petroleum and Minerals in 1980. In 1984 he then graduated with a PhD in electrical engineering from the University of Colorado Boulder.

Academic career
Amin joined the faculty of the Department of Electrical and Computer Engineering at Villanova University in 1985. In 2002, he became the Director of the Center for Advanced Communications (CAC), College of Engineering at Villanova University. As a researcher, Amin is known for his work on through-the-wall radar imaging. He is also known for his research applying signal processing to radar, communications, and satellite navigation.

Amin became a fellow of the Institute of Electrical and Electronics Engineers in 2001, a fellow of SPIE in 2007, a Fellow of the Institute of Engineering and Technology in 2010, and a fellow of the European Association for Signal Processing (EURASIP) in 2015. In 2016, he received the Humboldt Prize and was visiting professor at Technische Universität Darmstadt from 2016 to 2019. In 2017, Amin was appointed as a Fulbright Distinguished Chair in Advanced Science and Technology.

Editing
Amin is the editor of the 2010 book Through Wall Radar Imaging, the 2015 book Compressive Sensing for Urban Radar, and the 2017 book Radar for Indoor Monitoring: Detection, Classification, and Assessment.

Recognition
In 2000, Amin was awarded the Third Millennium Medal from IEEE, and was named a Distinguished Lecturer by the IEEE Signal Processing Society between 2003 and 2004. In 2009, he received the Technical Achievement Award from EURASIP. In 2014, Amin received the Technical Achievement Award from IEEE Signal Processing Society. He then received the Excellence in Radar Engineering, Warren D. White Award from IEEE Aerospace and Electronic Systems Society in 2015, and both the Alexander von Humboldt Research Award and IET Achievement Medal in 2016.

Amin received the 2009 Best Paper Award from IEEE Transactions on Signal Processing and the 2016 Premium Paper Award, IET Radar, Sonar & Navigation In 2017, he received both the Harry Rowe Mimno Paper Award from the IEEE Aerospace and Electronic Systems Magazine and the EURASIP Best Paper Award for Signal Processing (EURISIP-ELSEVIER). In 2018, he received the M. Barry Carlton Paper Award from the IEEE Transactions on Aerospace and Electronic Systems. His work in radar and its applications to health monitoring and through wall imaging was recognized with receiving the 2022 IEEE Dennis J. Picard Gold Medal in Radar Technologies and Applications.

References

External links
Villanova University Department of Electrical and Computer Engineering

Villanova University faculty
1955 births
American people of Egyptian descent
Engineers from Cairo
University of Colorado Boulder alumni
Cairo University alumni
Academic staff of Cairo University
King Fahd University of Petroleum and Minerals alumni
Radar imaging
Living people
Academic staff of Technische Universität Darmstadt